Houston Airport may refer to:

George Bush Intercontinental Airport, primary airport serving Houston, Texas, United States
William P. Hobby Airport, serving Houston, Texas, United States
Ellington Airport (Texas), serving Houston, Texas, United States
Houston Aerodrome near Houston, British Columbia, Canada

See also
 Houston County Airport (disambiguation)
 Houston International Airport (disambiguation)